The Maranhão gubernatorial election of 1990 was held in the Brazilian state of Maranhão on October 3, alongside Brazil's general elections, with a second round on November 25. PFL candidate, Edison Lobão, was elected on November 25, 1990.

Candidates 

1990 Brazilian gubernatorial elections
October 1990 events in South America

1990